Beate Kristiansen (born 22 January 1968) is a Norwegian sailor. She was born in Moss, and has represented Moss Seilforening. She competed at the 2004 Summer Olympics in Athens, where she placed ninth in the Yngling class, together with Karianne Eikeland and Lise Birgitte Fredriksen.

References

External links

Norwegian female sailors (sport)
1968 births
Living people
People from Moss, Norway
Sailors at the 2004 Summer Olympics – Yngling
Olympic sailors of Norway
Sportspeople from Viken (county)